Drannon Eugene "Skip" Guinn (born October 25, 1944) is a former Major League Baseball pitcher.

Early life 
Guinn graduated from Venice High School (Los Angeles) and then attended Santa Monica College. He was signed as an undrafted free agent by the Milwaukee Brewers in 1964.

Baseball career 
He played for the Atlanta Braves and was traded to the Houston Astros in April 1969 after first baseman Donn Clendenon refused to report to Houston.

References

Sources

Major League Baseball pitchers
Atlanta Braves players
Houston Astros players
Sarasota Braves players
West Palm Beach Braves players
Kinston Eagles players
Austin Braves players
Richmond Braves players
Shreveport Braves players
Savannah Senators players
Oklahoma City 89ers players
Wichita Aeros players
San Jose Bees players
Baseball players from Missouri
1944 births
Living people
People from St. Charles, Missouri
Venice High School (Los Angeles) alumni
Baseball players from Los Angeles